Rodolfo Sánchez (born 27 May 1969) is a former Cuban male volleyball player and coach. He was part of the Cuba men's national volleyball team at the 1992 Summer Olympics and 1996 Summer Olympics. He played for Greek powerhouse Olympiacos S.C., with whom he won the 1996 CEV Cup Winners' Cup. After his retirement he became head coach of Cuba men's national volleyball team.

Clubs
 Olympiacos S.C. (1995–96)

References

External links

1969 births
Living people
Cuban men's volleyball players
Olympiacos S.C. players
Place of birth missing (living people)
Volleyball players at the 1992 Summer Olympics
Volleyball players at the 1996 Summer Olympics
Olympic volleyball players of Cuba
Cuban volleyball coaches
People from Pinar del Río
Pan American Games medalists in volleyball
Pan American Games gold medalists for Cuba
Pan American Games bronze medalists for Cuba
Medalists at the 1991 Pan American Games
Medalists at the 1995 Pan American Games